Finchley Central is a London Underground station in the Church End area of Finchley, north London. The station is located on the High Barnet branch of the Northern line, between West Finchley and East Finchley stations;  it is the junction for the short branch to Mill Hill East. The station is around 7 miles north-northwest of Charing Cross and is in Travelcard Zone 4.

The station was opened on 22 August 1867 as part of the Great Northern Railway's line between Finsbury Park and Edgware stations. As part of London Underground's Northern Heights plan, Northern line trains started serving the station in 1940 and main line passenger services ended in 1941.

History

Original station

Finchley Central station was built by the Edgware, Highgate and London Railway (EH&LR) on its line from Finsbury Park to Edgware. As construction of the line was nearing completion and before it opened it was purchased in July 1867 by the larger Great Northern Railway (GNR), whose main line from King's Cross ran through Finsbury Park on its way to Potters Bar and the north.

The station, originally named Finchley and Hendon, opened along with the railway to Edgware on 22 August 1867 in what was then rural Middlesex. A branch line from Finchley Central to High Barnet was constructed by the GNR and opened on 1 April 1872. After the 1921 Railways Act created the Big Four railway companies, the GNR became part of the London & North Eastern Railway (LNER) in 1923. The station was renamed by the GNR twice: to Finchley on 1 February 1872 and Finchley (Church End) on 1 February 1894. It was given its current name on 1 April 1940.

At the start of the 1930s the station had around 54 trains daily from High Barnet running to Finsbury Park and then either King's Cross, Moorgate or Broad Street. Trains between Finchley Central and Edgware typically operated as a shuttle, although some trains ran through to the terminals.

Northern Heights plan
In 1935, the London Passenger Transport Board (LPTB) announced a proposal, which became known as the Northern Heights plan, to take over the LNER lines from Finsbury Park to Edgware, High Barnet and Alexandra Palace, and link them to the Northern line with new tunnels from the Northern line's terminus at Archway to East Finchley and to the Northern City line with a new surface connection between Drayton Park and Finsbury Park. The line from Finchley Central to Edgware closed for electrification and reconstruction on 11 September 1939.

The station was first served by electric Northern line trains on 14 April 1940 when the service was extended from East Finchley to High Barnet. After a period where the station was serviced by both operators, LNER steam services were ended on 2 March 1941. Following the outbreak of the Second World War in September 1939, completion of the electrification works on the line to Edgware was slowed and was completed only as far as Mill Hill East. Northern line services to Mill Hill East began on 18 May 1941 to serve the nearby Inglis Barracks.

Postwar

After the war, the plans to complete the Northern Heights works were reviewed but were not restarted. Maintenance works and reconstruction of war damage on the existing network had the greatest demand for LPTB funds. Funds for new works were severely limited and priority was given to the completion of the western and eastern extensions of the Central line to West Ruislip, Epping and Hainault.

A government-commissioned review of rail transport in the London area produced a report in 1946 that proposed many new lines. It anticipated that completion of the Northern Heights works would put pressure on the Northern line's capacity and it proposed that a relief line should be considered for one or other of the two branches. One of these, designated Route 12B, was proposed to run as a tube line in tunnel from Finchley Central to Clapham Junction via Golders Green, St John's Wood, Baker Street, Knightsbridge and Sloane Square.

Despite being shown as under construction on underground maps as late as 1950, work never restarted on the unimplemented parts of the Northern Heights plan. The proposal for Route 12B was also not developed by the LPTB or its successor organisations.

Before the war, Charles Holden and Reginald Uren designed replacement station buildings to be built on both sides of the road bridge at the north end of the station. The curtailment of the Northern Heights Plan means that the rebuilding work was not implemented and the station still retains much of its original Victorian architectural character today. As one of two EH&LR stations retaining its original buildings (the other is Mill Hill East), it is one of the oldest parts of the Underground system, pre-dating the first tunnelled section of the Northern line (the City & South London Railway) by more than twenty years.

British Railways (the successor to the LNER) continued to operate goods trains from Finsbury Park to the station's goods yard until 1 October 1962, when it was closed.

The station today

The station has two entrances. The main one, in the original station building, is on the north side of the tracks in Chaville Way, a short access road from the junction of Ballards Lane, Regents Park Road and Nether Street. The second entrance is to the south of the tracks in Station Road.

The station is in a cutting and the two entrances are joined by a footbridge over the tracks from which stairs and lifts connect to the platforms. The station is accessible for disabled passengers travelling in both directions.

The station has three platforms. Platforms 1 and 2, which share an island platform, are for northbound trains: platform 1 is used mainly by trains terminating at Finchley Central (and trains reverse using a reversing siding north of the station) or going to Mill Hill East; platform 2 is mainly used by trains going to High Barnet. Platform 3, a side platform, is for southbound trains. All platforms have canopies at their northern ends. The large station car park on the north side of the tracks, with access from Chaville Way, occupies the site of the former goods yard.

Services and connections
The station is in Travelcard Zone 4, between West Finchley and East Finchley on the Northern line. Train frequencies vary throughout the day, but generally operate every 3–7 minutes between 05:44 and 01:05 northbound to High Barnet and 05:31 and 01:15 southbound to Kennington (via Charing Cross) or Morden (via Bank). Trains to Mill Hill East operate between 05:16 and 01:06 (except for peak hours and after 23.00 all trains operate as a shuttle between Finchley Central and Mill Hill East).

London Bus routes 13, 125, 143, 326, 382 and 460, night route N20, and school routes 626 and 683 serve the station.

Cultural references

The station features in the Finchley Central mind game, which in turn became the basis for the game Mornington Crescent in the BBC Radio 4 series I'm Sorry I Haven't a Clue.

The New Vaudeville Band's song  "Finchley Central" reached No. 11 in the UK singles charts in 1967.

Harry Beck, designer of the original Tube map lived nearby and used the station in the 1930s. There is a commemorative plaque on Platform 3, together with a facsimile enamel panel of Beck's iconic 1933 design.

Notes and references

Notes

References

Bibliography

External links

London Transport Museum Photographic Archive

Northern line stations
Tube stations in the London Borough of Barnet
Former Great Northern Railway stations
Railway stations in Great Britain opened in 1867
Finchley
London Underground Night Tube stations